Arani Fort bus station, is the city of Arni's main bus station. Arni is the second largest town in Tiruvannamalai district after  Tiruvannamalai city. It is in  the central part of Arni town and is near the Arni Fort, hence its name.

Transport

 Tiruvannamalai, Villupuram, Vandavasi, Polur, salem, Coimbatore, Tirupur, Erode, Pondicherry, Tindivanam, Devikapuram, Chettupattu, Tanjavur, Pudukottai, Trichy, Gingee, Uthiramerur, Chengam, Thurinjikuppam, Jamunamarathur, and Bangalore are served by TNSTC and SETC buses.

References

Tiruvannamalai district